Tragopan is a bird genus in the pheasant family Phasianidae. Member of the genus are commonly called "horned pheasants" because males have two brightly colored, fleshy horns on their head that can be erected during courtship displays. The habit of tragopans to nest in trees is unique among phasianids.

Taxonomy
The genus Tragopan was introduced by the French naturalist Georges Cuvier in 1829 for the satyr tragopan. The name tragopan is a mythical horned purple-headed bird mentioned by the Roman authors Pliny and Pomponius Mela.

The genus contains five species.

References

 
Bird genera
 
Taxa named by Georges Cuvier